Narayan S. Hosmane is an Indian-born cancer research scientist who made the featured article in NRI Achievers magazine and is currently distinguished research professor of Chemistry and Biochemistry.  He received the Humboldt Research Award for senior scientists twice. This award is presented annually to scientists worldwide as a tribute to their lifelong accomplishments by Alexander von Humboldt Foundation, Bonn, Germany.

He was the founder of "Boron in the Americas" (formerly known as BUSA) and hosted the organization's first meeting in Dallas in April 1988. He has published over 300 papers in leading scientific journals and was ranked by the Institute for Scientific Information (ISI) in the top 50% of the most cited chemists in the world from 1981–1997.

In September 2007, the NRI Institute presented him with its Pride of India Gold Award, recognizing his outstanding accomplishments, at the launch of the NRI Institute’s Washington D.C. chapter, and again in January, he was honored by the same NRI Institute with its Lifetime Achievement Pravasi Award and Bharath Samman Medal during the Annual Conference held in New Delhi. A fellow of the Royal Society of Chemistry and the American Institute of Chemists, he has also been a foreign member of Russian Academy of Natural Sciences (RANS)  and listed in Who's Who in the World.

Early life
Hosmane was born in Gokarna(1948), Uttar Kannada district, Karnataka state, India, to a Havyaka Brahmin family. Hosmane earned his high school diploma (SSLC) from Bhadrakali High School, Gokarna (1964) and soon after, went to Dr. A. V. Baliga college, Kumta for his college studies, where he earned his Bachelor of Science in Chemistry with Botany as minor.

He is married to Sumathy Rao, who came from a Konkani-speaking family. He has one daughter and one son.

Academic career 
Hosmane earned Master of Science degree from Karnataka University, Karnataka, India. He then obtained a Ph.D. degree in Organometallic/Inorganic Chemistry on 'Some reactions of stannic chloride with silicon hydrides and some novel group IV derivatives of mercury'  in 1974 from the University of Edinburgh, Scotland.

After his postdoctoral research training in Queen's University of Belfast, he joined the Lambeg Industrial Research Institute in Northern Ireland, and then moved to the United States to study carboranes and metallacarboranes. After postdoctoral work with Russell Grimes at the University of Virginia, in 1979 he joined the faculty at the Virginia Polytechnic Institute and State University. In 1982 he joined the faculty at the Southern Methodist University, where he became Professor of Chemistry in 1989. In 1998, he moved to Northern Illinois University and is currently a Distinguished Research Professor of Chemistry and Biochemistry and the Inaugural Board of Trustees Professor.

In 2011, while attempting to produce single-walled carbon nanotubes, Hosmane discovered that a known technique for carbon production (burning magnesium with dry ice) produced layers of graphene.

Professional career

Professional affiliations 
  Fellow of the Royal Society of Chemistry (CChem FRSC)
  Fellow of the American Institute of Chemists (FAIC)
  Member of the American Chemical Society (ACS)
  Member of the Sigma Xi Society
  Member of the International Council on Main Group Chemistry, Inc. (ICMGC)

Boards and editorships 
 
  Section Editor of Applied Organometallic Chemistry, 2003–present
  International Editorial Advisory Board for Organometallics, a journal of the American Chemical Society, Jan   2006–present
  Regional Editor of Molecules, an international Internet journal.
  Editorial boards, Main Group Metal Chemistry (1999 – present) and Main Group Chemistry (2006 – present)
  Guest Editor, Special Issue of the Applied Organometallic Chemistry – Main Group Metal Compounds commemorating 65th birthday of Professor Thomas P. Fehlner entitled "Recent Advances in Inorganometallic Chemistry" published by Wiley-VCH, in April / May 2003.
  Guest Editor, Special Issue of the Journal of Organometallic Chemistry commemorating 70th birthday of Professor Sheldon G. Shore entitled "From Borane Cages to Metal Clusters: Recent Developments," published by Elsevier Science, in November 2000.
  Guest Editor, Special Issue of Phosphorus, Sulfur, and Silicon Volume 87, Numbers 1–4, 1994) entitled "Symposium on Recent Advances in the Chemistry of the Main-Group Elements," Austin, Texas, 24–27 October 1993, published by Gordon and Breach.

Honors and awards

References

Featured Article in NRI Achievers Magazine

External links 
 Northern Illinois University Inaugural Board of Trustees Professorship Award
 BUSA V Award Recipient – Prof. Narayan S. Hosmane
 Northern Today – Prof. Hosmane honored by Indian university
 NIU news release – NIU’s Narayan Hosmane
 Dr.Narayan's Home Page 
 Prof. Narayan S. Hosmane's NIU Personal page
 Narayan Hosmane – research profile on BiomedExperts
 The  Wizard & His Inspiring Life Story: Narayan S. Hosmane
 IndiaGlitz – 'Learn Positive' – Prof.Hosmane
 Humboldt-Foundation Awardees-Prof. Dr. Narayan S. Hosmane
 Lifetime Achievement Pravasi Award-Dr. Narayan S. Hosmane
  Russian Academy Membership-Dr. Narayan S. Hosmane

People from Uttara Kannada
University of Virginia fellows
Auburn University personnel
Alumni of the University of Edinburgh
Southern Methodist University faculty
Northern Illinois University faculty
Living people
1948 births
American academics of Indian descent
Karnatak University alumni
Indian scholars